Tim Hamilton is a paralympic equestrian from Canada.

He competed in the 1984 Summer Paralympics and won a silver and bronze medal.

References

External links 
 

Living people
Canadian male equestrians
Paralympic equestrians of Canada
Paralympic silver medalists for Canada
Paralympic bronze medalists for Canada
Paralympic medalists in equestrian
Equestrians at the 1984 Summer Paralympics
Medalists at the 1984 Summer Paralympics
Year of birth missing (living people)
21st-century Canadian people
20th-century Canadian people